Ovince Saint Preux (born April 8, 1983) is a Haitian-American professional mixed martial artist who competes in the light heavyweight division of the UFC. A professional competitor since 2008, Saint Preux has also formerly competed for Strikeforce, the XFC, and Shark Fights. He is known for his unorthodox fighting style, and has gained notability and notoriety for having won four fights using the rare Von Flue choke submission, leading to fans renaming it to the "Von Preux choke".

Background
Saint Preux was born in Immokalee, Florida, to Haitian immigrant parents. He attended Immokalee High School in Immokalee, Florida, where he wrestled, played defensive end for the football team, and ran track. As a wrestler, he compiled a record of 26–1, and was the state's 1A runner-up in his weight class. During his senior year in football, he registered 75 tackles, including a school-record 18 sacks, and was named All-State. In track, he competed in the 110-meter hurdles, the 300-meter hurdles, the discus throw, and the 4x400 relay.

Saint Preux played college football for the Tennessee Volunteers from 2001 to 2004. After redshirting in 2001, he played primarily as a reserve at both defensive end and linebacker. He earned varsity letters in 2002 and 2004, appearing in seventeen games during his college career. He graduated in 2004 with a degree in sociology, and began to train in kickboxing and submission grappling.

After two unsuccessful attempts at professional football, Saint Preux gave up the sport and began to take an interest in martial arts as a form of training. Saint Preux, who currently trains at Knoxville Martial Arts Academy in Knoxville, Tennessee, began to fight professionally at the suggestion of his coach.

Saint Preux attributes his confidence in the ring to his membership in Omega Psi Phi fraternity.

Mixed martial arts career

Early career
Saint Preux compiled an undefeated amateur MMA record of 5–0 before making his professional MMA debut at VFC 1 against Rodney Wallace, which he lost by decision. In his second MMA match, he suffered another decision loss. His next match came against Robert Turner which he won by a brutal head kick at XFC 7: School of Hard Knox. Saint Preux was a runner-up for Inside MMA's Submission of The Year for 2009 with a calf slicer against Ombey Mobley, but was beaten by Toby Imada's reverse triangle.

Strikeforce
In June 2010, Saint Preux signed a multi-fight deal with Strikeforce. His debut match came against Chris Hawk at Strikeforce: Nashville, which he won due to TKO (punches) in the first round.

After knocking out UFC veteran Jason Day in eight seconds outside the Strikeforce organization, he returned to fight Antwain Britt in his second Strikeforce fight on a ShoMMA Strikeforce Challengers event. He won by unanimous decision.

Saint Preux returned to action less than a month after his win over Britt to fight UFC and Strikeforce veteran Benji Radach on the main card of Strikeforce: Henderson vs. Babalu II. Saint Preux defeated Radach via unanimous decision.

Saint Preux competed in his third Strikeforce fight in less than seven weeks and faced Abongo Humphrey on January 7, 2011, at Strikeforce Challengers: Woodley vs. Saffiedine. He won the fight via unanimous decision. This three-fight series over a seven-week period marked the only time a Strikeforce fighter competed on three successive shows.

Saint Preux faced Joe Cason on July 22, 2011, at Strikeforce Challengers: Voelker vs. Bowling III. He won the fight via submission to strikes in the first round. In his post-fight interview, Saint Preux asked for either Renato Sobral or Gegard Mousasi as his next opponent.

Saint Preux next fought Gegard Mousasi on December 17, 2011, at Strikeforce: Melendez vs. Masvidal. He lost the fight via unanimous decision.

Saint Preux fought T. J. Cook on August 18, 2012, at Strikeforce: Rousey vs. Kaufman. He won the fight via third-round knockout with a punch. Saint Preux compiled a record of 5–1 within the promotion.

Ultimate Fighting Championship

2013
In January 2013, the Strikeforce organization was closed by its parent company Zuffa with a majority of the Strikeforce fighters being brought over to the Ultimate Fighting Championship.

For his UFC debut, Saint Preux faced fellow promotional newcomer Gian Villante on April 27, 2013, at UFC 159. The fight ended in unusual fashion as Saint Preux accidentally poked Villante in the right eye with his thumb and referee Kevin Mulhall immediately called an end to the fight after asking Villante if he could see. As a result of the injury, the fight went to the judges' scorecards and Saint Preux won a majority technical decision.

For his second bout with the promotion, Saint Preux faced Cody Donovan on August 17, 2013, at UFC Fight Night 26. He won the fight via knockout at 2:07 in the first round.

2014
Saint Preux was briefly linked to a bout against Thiago Silva on January 15, 2014, at UFC Fight Night 35. However, Silva pulled out of the bout less than 24 hours after the announcement. The match against Silva was rescheduled for March 15, 2014 at UFC 171. However, the rescheduled bout was cancelled on February 7, 2014, after Silva was arrested by Florida police on attempted murder charges. Saint Preux instead fought Nikita Krylov at the event, winning in the first round with a Von Flue choke. The rare submission win also earned Saint Preux his first Performance of the Night bonus award.

For his fourth fight, Saint Preux faced Ryan Jimmo on June 14, 2014, at UFC 174. He won the fight in the second round when Jimmo verbally submitted due to a broken arm as a result of blocking one of Saint Preux's kicks.

Saint Preux faced Ryan Bader on August 16, 2014, in the main event at UFC Fight Night 47. He lost the fight via unanimous decision.

Saint Preux was expected to face Rafael Cavalcante on November 8, 2014, at UFC Fight Night 56. However, Cavalcante pulled out of the bout citing injury and was replaced by Francimar Barroso. However, on October 29, it was announced that Saint Preux would step up to replace an injured Jimi Manuwa in the main event against Maurício Rua. Despite being the underdog and fighting in Rua's home country of Brazil, Saint Preux won the fight via knockout just 34 seconds into the first round. Shogun's loss to Saint Preux was the fastest defeat of his professional career. The win also earned Saint Preux his second Performance of the Night bonus award.

2015
Saint Preux faced Patrick Cummins on April 18, 2015, at UFC on Fox 15. He won the fight via knockout in the first round.

Saint Preux faced Glover Teixeira on August 8, 2015, at UFC Fight Night 73. He lost the back-and-forth fight by submission in the third round. Both participants were awarded Fight of the Night honors.

2016
Saint Preux next faced Rafael Cavalcante on February 6, 2016, at UFC Fight Night 82. Despite Preux injuring his ankle in the first round, he won the fight by unanimous decision.

Saint Preux was tabbed as a short notice injury replacement to face Jon Jones for the interim light heavyweight title on April 23, 2016, at UFC 197 filling in for Daniel Cormier.  Saint Preux lost via unanimous decision. Saint Preux's coach revealed that Saint Preux's arm was broken in the second round.

Saint Preux faced Jimi Manuwa on October 8, 2016, at UFC 204. He lost the fight via knockout in the second round.

2017
Saint Preux was expected to face Jan Błachowicz on February 4, 2017, at UFC Fight Night 104. However, Błachowicz was pulled from the fight in mid-January and replaced by promotional newcomer Volkan Oezdemir. Saint Preux lost the fight via split decision. 14 of 16 MMA media outlets scored the fight for Saint Preux.

Saint Preux faced Marcos Rogério de Lima on April 22, 2017, at UFC Fight Night 108. He defeated Lima due to a Von Flue choke submission in the second round.  With this win, Saint Preux is the only fighter to successfully win via Von Flue choke twice in the UFC.

A rematch with Maurício Rua was expected to take place on September 23, 2017, at UFC Fight Night 117. The bout was changed after Rua suffered an injury and was promptly replaced with Yushin Okami. Saint Preux won the fight via Von Flue choke in the first round, marking his third win via this submission. This win earned him the Performance of the Night bonus.

Saint Preux stepped in to replace Patrick Cummins in a fight against Corey Anderson on November 4, 2017, at UFC 217. After winning the first round by landing the more effective strikes and rocking Anderson in the final seconds and losing the second round due to Anderson's wrestling, Saint Preux won the fight via a head kick knockout in the opening minute of the third round. This win earned him a $25,000 Performance of the Night bonus award.

2018
Saint Preux was expected to face Ilir Latifi on January 27, 2018, at UFC on Fox 27. However,  Latifi was injured during a training session and he was forced to pull out from the bout. As a result, the bout was cancelled. The pair was rebooked and the bout took place on February 24, 2018, at UFC on Fox 28. Saint Preux lost the fight via technical submission in the first round.

Saint Preux faced Tyson Pedro on June 23, 2018, at UFC Fight Night 132. He won the fight via submission in the first round. This win earned him the Performance of the Night award.

Saint Preux faced Dominick Reyes on October 6, 2018, at UFC 229. He lost the fight via unanimous decision.

2019
Saint Preux was expected to face Misha Cirkunov on March 2, 2019, at UFC 235. However, on February 11, it was announced that Saint Preux suffered an injury and was pulled from the fight. He was replaced by Johnny Walker.

Saint Preux faced Nikita Krylov in a rematch on April 13, 2019, at UFC 236. He lost the fight via a submission due to a rear-naked choke in round two.

Saint Preux faced Michał Oleksiejczuk on September 28, 2019, at UFC on ESPN+ 18. He won the fight via submission due to a Von Flue choke in the second round; thereby extended his ending with this submission to a record four wins. The win also earned Saint Preux his sixth Performance of the Night bonus award.

Saint Preux was briefly liked to face Ryan Spann on February 8, 2020, at UFC 247. However, promotion matchmakers elected to go in another direction and the pairing was scrapped from the event.

Saint Preux was suspended for three months by USADA for tested positive for Ostarine and S-23, the family of selective androgen receptor modulators (SARMs), where the prohibited subsistence was found from a tainted supplement. The suspension retroactive from October 25, 2019, and he was eligible to fight again on January 25, 2020.

2020
Saint Preux was expected to face Shamil Gamzatov on April 25, 2020. However, Gamzatov was forced to pull from the event due to COVID-19 pandemic travel restriction, and Saint Preux was pulled from the event and was scheduled to meet Ion Cuțelaba at the event. However, on April 9, Dana White, the president of UFC announced that this event was postponed to a future date. On April 24, 2020, it was revealed that the fight against Cuțelaba was cancelled due to Cuțelaba not being allowed to leave his home country of Moldova due to a pandemic travel ban.

Saint Preux moved up to the heavyweight division and faced Ben Rothwell at the UFC Fight Night: Smith vs. Teixeira on May 13, 2020. He lost the fight via split decision.

Saint Preux was scheduled to face Shamil Gamzatov on April 25, 2020.  However, Gamzatov was forced to pull from the event due to COVID-19 pandemic travel restriction The match was rescheduled on August 22, 2020, at UFC on ESPN 15. However, for unknown reason, Gamzatov was pulled from the bout and he was replaced by Alonzo Menifield. Just hours before the event was scheduled to begin, it was announced that the bout was canceled due to Saint Preux testing positive for COVID-19. The bout eventually took place on September 5, 2020, at UFC Fight Night 176. Saint Preux won the fight via knockout in the second round. This win earned him a Performance of the Night award.

Saint Preux faced Jamahal Hill on December 5, 2020, at UFC on ESPN 19. At the weigh-ins, he weighed in at 207.5 pounds, one and a half pounds over the light heavyweight non-title fight limit. The bout proceeded at a catchweight and Saint Preux was fined 20% of his individual purse, which went to his opponent Hill. He lost the fight via second-round TKO.

2021
Saint Preux was scheduled to face Maxim Grishin on June 26, 2021, at UFC Fight Night 190. However, Grishin withdrew from the bout due to visa issues and was replaced by Tanner Boser in a heavyweight bout. In the second round, Saint Preux secured a takedown, but Boser appeared to use the fence in order to assist himself back to his feet, with the referee giving him a warning. However, Saint Preux lost the fight by knockout moments later. Saint Preux later announced that he would be appealing the loss in hopes of overturning it to a no contest.

Saint Preux was scheduled to face Philipe Lins on November 13, 2021, at UFC Fight Night 197. However Saint Preux withdrew from the fight for undisclosed reasons  and the bout was cancelled.

2022
Saint Preux had a rematch against Maurício Rua on May 7, at UFC 274. He won the fight via split decision.

Saint Preux was scheduled to face  Alexander Gustafsson on December 10, 2022, at UFC 282.  However, Gustafsson withdrew due to undisclosed reason and was briefly replaced by Philipe Lins. In turn, Lins withdrew from the bout due to an undisclosed reason and was replaced by UFC newcomer Antonio Trocoli. However, Trocoli withdrew due to visa issues. As a result, Saint Preux was pulled from the card as well due to the promotion being unable to find another replacement.

2023
The match between Saint Preux and Philipe Lins was rescheduled on February 18, 2023 at UFC Fight Night 219. He lost the fight via knockout in the first round.

Championships and achievements

Mixed martial arts 
 Ultimate Fighting Championship
 Performance of the Night (Seven times) 
 Fight of the Night (One time) 
 Most Von Flue choke submission victories in UFC history (4)
 Tied for third most submission victories in UFC Light Heavyweight division history (5) (w. Jon Jones and Misha Cirkunov)
 Second most stoppage wins in UFC Light Heavyweight division history (11)
 Tied (with Maurício Rua) for most bouts in UFC Light Heavyweight division history (24)
 MMAJunkie.com
 2015 April Knockout of the Month 
 2019 September Submission of the Month 
 King of the Cage
 KOTC Light Heavyweight Tournament Champion

Mixed martial arts record

|-
|Loss
|align=center|26–17
|Philipe Lins
|KO (punches)
|UFC Fight Night: Andrade vs. Blanchfield
|
|align=center|1
|align=center|0:49
|Las Vegas, Nevada, United States
|
|-
|Win
|align=center|26–16
|Maurício Rua
|Decision (split)
|UFC 274
|
|align=center|3
|align=center|5:00
|Phoenix, Arizona, United States
|
|-
|Loss
|align=center|25–16
|Tanner Boser
|KO (punches)
|UFC Fight Night: Gane vs. Volkov
|
|align=center|2
|align=center|2:31
|Las Vegas, Nevada, United States
|
|-
|Loss
|align=center|25–15
|Jamahal Hill
|TKO (punches)
|UFC on ESPN: Hermansson vs. Vettori
|
|align=center|2
|align=center|3:37
|Las Vegas, Nevada, United States
|
|-
|Win
|align=center|25–14
|Alonzo Menifield
|KO (punch)
|UFC Fight Night: Overeem vs. Sakai
|
|align=center|2
|align=center|4:07
|Las Vegas, Nevada, United States
|
|-
|Loss
|align=center|24–14
|Ben Rothwell
|Decision (split)
|UFC Fight Night: Smith vs. Teixeira
|
|align=center|3
|align=center|5:00
|Jacksonville, Florida, United States
|
|-
|Win
|align=center|24–13
|Michał Oleksiejczuk
|Submission (Von Flue choke)
|UFC Fight Night: Hermansson vs. Cannonier 
|
|align=center|2
|align=center|2:46
|Copenhagen, Denmark
|
|-
|Loss
|align=center|23–13
|Nikita Krylov
|Submission (rear-naked choke)
|UFC 236 
|
|align=center|2
|align=center|2:31
|Atlanta, Georgia, United States
|
|-
|Loss
|align=center|23–12
|Dominick Reyes
|Decision (unanimous)
|UFC 229 
|
|align=center|3
|align=center|5:00
|Las Vegas, Nevada, United States
|  
|-
|Win
|align=center|23–11
|Tyson Pedro
|Submission (straight armbar)
|UFC Fight Night: Cowboy vs. Edwards
|
|align=center|1
|align=center|2:54
|Kallang, Singapore
|
|-
|Loss
|align=center|22–11
|Ilir Latifi
|Technical Submission (guillotine choke)
|UFC on Fox: Emmett vs. Stephens
|
|align=center|1
|align=center|3:48
|Orlando, Florida, United States
|
|-
|Win
|align=center|22–10
|Corey Anderson
|KO (head kick)
|UFC 217
|
|align=center|3
|align=center|1:25
|New York City, New York, United States
|
|-
|Win
|align=center|21–10
|Yushin Okami
|Technical Submission (Von Flue choke)
|UFC Fight Night: Saint Preux vs. Okami 
|
|align=center|1
|align=center|1:50
|Saitama, Japan
|
|-
|Win
|align=center|20–10
|Marcos Rogério de Lima
|Submission (Von Flue choke)
|UFC Fight Night: Swanson vs. Lobov
|
|align=center|2
|align=center|2:11
|Nashville, Tennessee, United States
|
|-
|Loss
|align=center|19–10
|Volkan Oezdemir
|Decision (split)
|UFC Fight Night: Bermudez vs. The Korean Zombie
|
|align=center|3
|align=center|5:00
|Houston, Texas, United States
| 
|-
|Loss
|align=center|19–9
|Jimi Manuwa
|KO (punch)
|UFC 204
|
|align=center|2
|align=center|2:38
|Manchester, England
|
|-
|Loss
|align=center|19–8
|Jon Jones
|Decision (unanimous)
|UFC 197
|
|align=center|5
|align=center|5:00
|Las Vegas, Nevada, United States
|
|-
|Win
|align=center|19–7
|Rafael Cavalcante
|Decision (unanimous)
|UFC Fight Night: Hendricks vs. Thompson
|
|align=center|3
|align=center|5:00
|Las Vegas, Nevada, United States
|
|-
| Loss
| align=center| 18–7
| Glover Teixeira
| Technical Submission (rear-naked choke)
| UFC Fight Night: Teixeira vs. Saint Preux
| 
| align=center| 3
| align=center| 3:10
| Nashville, Tennessee, United States
| 
|-
| Win
| align=center| 18–6
| Patrick Cummins
| KO (punches)
| UFC on Fox: Machida vs. Rockhold
| 
| align=center| 1
| align=center| 4:54
| Newark, New Jersey, United States
| 
|-
| Win
| align=center| 17–6
| Maurício Rua
| KO (punches)
| UFC Fight Night: Shogun vs. Saint Preux
| 
| align=center| 1
| align=center| 0:34
| Uberlândia, Brazil
| 
|-
| Loss
| align=center| 16–6
| Ryan Bader
| Decision (unanimous)
| UFC Fight Night: Bader vs. Saint Preux
| 
| align=center| 5
| align=center| 5:00
| Bangor, Maine, United States
| 
|-
| Win
| align=center| 16–5
| Ryan Jimmo
| Submission (kimura)
| UFC 174
| 
| align=center| 2
| align=center| 2:10
| Vancouver, British Columbia, Canada
| 
|-
| Win
| align=center| 15–5
| Nikita Krylov
| Technical Submission (Von Flue choke)
| UFC 171
| 
| align=center| 1
| align=center| 1:29
| Dallas, Texas, United States
| 
|-
| Win
| align=center| 14–5
| Cody Donovan
| KO (punches)
| UFC Fight Night: Shogun vs. Sonnen
| 
| align=center| 1
| align=center| 2:07
| Boston, Massachusetts, United States
| 
|-
| Win
| align=center| 13–5
| Gian Villante
| Technical Decision (majority)
| UFC 159
| 
| align=center| 3
| align=center| 0:33
| Newark, New Jersey, United States
| 
|-
| Win
| align=center| 12–5
| T.J. Cook
| KO (punch)
| Strikeforce: Rousey vs. Kaufman
| 
| align=center| 3
| align=center| 0:20
| San Diego, California, United States
| 
|-
| Loss
| align=center| 11–5
| Gegard Mousasi
| Decision (unanimous)
| Strikeforce: Melendez vs. Masvidal
| 
| align=center| 3
| align=center| 5:00
| San Diego, California, United States
| 
|-
| Win
| align=center| 11–4
| Joe Cason
| TKO (submission to punches)
| Strikeforce Challengers: Voelker vs. Bowling III
| 
| align=center| 1
| align=center| 1:12
| Las Vegas, Nevada, United States
| 
|-
| Win
| align=center| 10–4
| Abongo Humphrey
| Decision (unanimous)
| Strikeforce Challengers: Woodley vs. Saffiedine
| 
| align=center| 3
| align=center| 5:00
| Nashville, Tennessee, United States
| 
|-
| Win
| align=center| 9–4
| Benji Radach
| Decision (unanimous)
| Strikeforce: Henderson vs. Babalu II
| 
| align=center| 3
| align=center| 5:00
| St. Louis, Missouri, United States
| 
|-
| Win
| align=center| 8–4
| Antwain Britt
| Decision (unanimous)
| Strikeforce Challengers: Wilcox vs. Ribeiro
| 
| align=center| 3
| align=center| 5:00
| Jackson, Mississippi, United States
| 
|-
| Win
| align=center| 7–4
| Jason Day
| KO (punches)
| EFC 5: Summer Rumble
| 
| align=center| 1
| align=center| 0:08
| Lloydminster, Saskatchewan, Canada
| 
|-
| Win
| align=center| 6–4
| Claudio Cunha Godoy
| TKO (arm injury)
| Washington Combat: Battle of the Legends
| 
| align=center| 1
| align=center| 5:00
| Washington, D.C., United States
| 
|-
| Win
| align=center| 5–4
| Chris Hawk
| TKO (punches)
| Strikeforce: Nashville
| 
| align=center| 1
| align=center| 0:47
| Nashville, Tennessee, United States
| 
|-
| Win
| align=center| 4–4
| Brett Chism
| TKO (punches)
| GTO Cage Fights
| 
| align=center| 1
| align=center| 1:15
| Griffin, Georgia, United States
| 
|-
| Loss
| align=center| 3–4
| Virgil Zwicker
| TKO (punches)
| Top Combat Championship 1
| 
| align=center| 2
| align=center| 0:46
| San Juan, Puerto Rico
| 
|-
| Loss
| align=center| 3–3
| Nik Fekete
| Decision (unanimous)
| VFC: A Night of Vengeance
| 
| align=center| 2
| align=center| 5:00
| Oranjestad, Aruba
| 
|-
| Win
| align=center| 3–2
| Jonathan Smith
| Submission (rear-naked choke)
| VFC: A Night of Vengeance
| 
| align=center| 1
| align=center| 0:46
| Oranjestad, Aruba
| 
|-
| Win
| align=center| 2–2
| Ombey Mobley
| Submission (calf slicer)
| XFC 8
| 
| align=center| 1
| align=center| 2:36
| Knoxville, Tennessee, United States
| 
|-
| Win
| align=center| 1–2
| Robert Turner
| KO (head kick)
| XFC 7
| 
| align=center| 1
| align=center| 2:36
| Knoxville, Tennessee, United States
| 
|-
| Loss
| align=center| 0–2
| Ray Lizama
| Decision (unanimous)
| Shark Fights 2
| 
| align=center| 3
| align=center| 3:00
| Amarillo, Texas, United States
| 
|-
| Loss
| align=center| 0–1
| Rodney Wallace
| Decision (unanimous)
| VFC 1
| 
| align=center| 3
| align=center| 5:00
| Concord, North Carolina, United States
| 
|-

Mixed martial arts amateur record

|-
| Win
| align=center| 5–0
| Todd Smart
| KO (punches)
| KOTC: Reckless
| 
| align=center| 1
| align=center| 1:28
| Greenville, Mississippi, United States
| 
|-
| Win
| align=center| 4–0
| Mike Cormier
| Submission (rear-naked choke)
| KOTC: Reckless
| 
| align=center| 1
| align=center| 2:59
| Greenville, Mississippi, United States
| 
|-
| Win
| align=center| 3–0
| Joe Miller
| KO 
| Warrior FC 77
| 
| align=center| 1
| align=center| 1:03
| Monticello, Kentucky, United States
| 
|-
| Win
| align=center| 2–0
| Chris Stanton
| TKO (punches)
| Mixed Martial Arts in the Valley 8
| 
| align=center| 1
| align=center| 2:07
| Cherokee, North Carolina, United States
| 
|-
| Win
| align=center| 1–0
| Daniel Crockett
| Decision (unanimous)
| Crossing the Line V
| 
| align=center| 3
| align=center| 3:00
| Bristol, Virginia, United States
| 
|-

See also
 List of current UFC fighters
 List of male mixed martial artists

References

External links
UFC profile
 

Living people
1983 births
People from Immokalee, Florida
Sportspeople from Knoxville, Tennessee
American male mixed martial artists
Mixed martial artists from Tennessee
Light heavyweight mixed martial artists
Mixed martial artists utilizing kickboxing
Mixed martial artists utilizing wrestling
Mixed martial artists utilizing Brazilian jiu-jitsu
American sportspeople of Haitian descent
University of Tennessee alumni
Tennessee Volunteers football players
Ultimate Fighting Championship male fighters
American male sport wrestlers
Amateur wrestlers
American practitioners of Brazilian jiu-jitsu